Carex montana, also called mountain or soft-leaved sedge, is a species of grass of the genus Carex. It is most commonly found in Europe and Central Russia.

It is native to most countries in Europe including the UK, Germany, France and Spain.

It is tolerant of alkaline soils and temperatures down to −23 °C.

References

montana
Flora of Europe
Plants described in 1753
Taxa named by Carl Linnaeus